Donacia obscura is a species of leaf beetle native to Europe.

References

External links
Images representing Donacia at BOLD

Donaciinae
Beetles described in 1813
Beetles of Europe